Jeff Kelley is an art critic, author, and curator. A practicing art critic since 1977, his reviews and essays about artists including Chinese conceptual artist Ai Weiwei have appeared in publications including Artforum, Art in America, and the Los Angeles Times.

In 1993 the University of California Press published Essays on the Blurring of Art and Life, a collection of significant writings by American conceptual artist Allan Kaprow edited by Kelley. He is also the author of Childsplay: the Art of Allan Kaprow, published in 2004 by UC Press.

Kelley lives in Oakland, California.  He was married to Chinese-born American painter Hung Liu until her death on August 7, 2021.

Selected exhibitions 

Between 1998 and 2008 Kelley served as Consulting Curator of Contemporary Art at the Asian Art Museum of San Francisco, organizing major exhibitions by contemporary Chinese artists including:
  Sui Jianguo, “The Sleep of Reason,” 2005
  Liu Xiaodong, “The Three Gorges Project,” 2006
  Zhan Wang, “On Gold Mountain: Sculpture from the Sierra,” 2008
In 2008, Kelley curated "Half-Life of a Dream: Chinese Contemporary Art from the Logan Collection" at the San Francisco Museum of Modern Art.

Teaching
From 1993 to 2005 Kelley taught Art Theory and Criticism at the University of California, Berkeley. He founded and served as the director of the Center for Research in Contemporary Art (CRCA) at the University of Texas at Arlington. He has also held teaching positions at the University of Nevada at Las Vegas, California College of Arts and Crafts, and the San Francisco Art Institute.

External links 
 PDF version of Essays on the Blurring of Art and Life, retrieved 3/14/2017
 Press release for "Half-Life of a Dream: Chinese Contemporary Art from the Logan Collection," SFMOMA website
 Review by Kelley of Ai Weiwei exhibition on Alcatraz Island from Square Cylinder, 2015

References 

 

Year of birth missing (living people)
Living people
American art critics